The phrase Conference USA basketball tournament may refer to:

Conference USA men's basketball tournament
Conference USA women's basketball tournament